Azuero may also refer to:

Azuero Peninsula in Panama
Azuero province, a province that existed in 1855 in the Republic of New Granada
Vicente Azuero, Colombian politician